Orient is a 1924 German silent drama film directed by Gennaro Righelli and starring Maria Jacobini, Harry Liedtke and Magnus Stifter. It was shot at the Grunewald in Berlin and on location in Egypt. 
The film's sets were designed by the art director István Szirontai Lhotka.

Cast
 Maria Jacobini as Katja / Yamile
 Harry Liedtke as Harry Russin
 Magnus Stifter as Scheich
 Arthur Wellin as Mohand
 Leopold von Ledebur as Mifud
 Viggo Larsen as Bob, Russins Freund
 Louis Ralph as Max
 Sergio Mari as Izzet
 Else Wasa
 Margarete Kupfer

References

Bibliography
 Bock, Hans-Michael & Bergfelder, Tim. The Concise CineGraph. Encyclopedia of German Cinema. Berghahn Books, 2009.

External links

1924 films
Films of the Weimar Republic
German silent feature films
Films directed by Gennaro Righelli
German black-and-white films
1920s German films
1924 drama films
German drama films
Films shot in Egypt